Elías Barreiro (born 1930 in Santiago de Cuba, Cuba) is a Cuban guitarist and professor.

Academic background

Elías Barreiro began his musical studies at the Havana Conservatory of Music. He also studied guitar in Cuba with renowned professor Isaac Nicola before he established his permanent residence in the US in 1966. At a later time Barreiro received post-graduate classes from Maestro Andrés Segovia at Santiago de Compostela, Spain.

Guitarist
Elías Barreiro performed extensively in Cuba and abroad as a guitar recitalist and soloist, with orchestra and chamber ensembles. He gave his first public recital at Lyceum Society of Ciego de Avila, Camagüey, Cuba, and his first concert in the US at Tulane University (Dixon Hall Auditorium) in December 1966. As a result of this concert, he was offered a full-time position as professor of guitar at the University. Barreiro has also published numerous recordings.

Professor
Until his recent retirement, Elías Barreiro served as the Head of the Guitar Program at Tulane University. Several of his former students perform regularly in concerts and hold faculty positions at Universities and Schools throughout the United States.

Other activities
Barreiro has participated as a member of juries at numerous national and international competitions, and also edited and arranged scores for over forty books on guitar music. He has published works with Hansen Publications, the Willis Music Company, Editions Orphee, and now exclusively with Mel Bay Publications. Two selections from Barreiro's book/cd Guitar Music of Cuba, published by Mel Bay Publications, were used as incidental music in the 2002 MGM film Original Sin (2001 film).

Awards and recognition

Barreiro is the recipient of the 1992 Mentor Award given by the Guitar Foundation of America. In 2000, he received a Lifetime Achievement Award in Music from the New Orleans International Music Colloquium; and a Proclamation Award from the City of New Orleans for outstanding service to the community.

References

External links

Mel Bay: https://www.melbay.com/Author/Default.aspx?AuthorId=37547

Living people
Cuban musicians
1930 births
Cuban guitarists
Cuban male guitarists
Cuban classical guitarists